Anocha Suwichakornpong (born 1976) is a Thai independent film director, screenwriter and producer. She is Visiting Lecturer on Art, Film, and Visual Studies at Harvard University. Her films have been the subject of retrospectives at the Museum of the Moving Image, New York; TIFF Cinematheque, Toronto; Cinema Moderne, Montreal; and Olhar De Cinema, Brazil, among others. Her work, informed by the socio-political history of Thailand, has received much international critical acclaim and numerous awards. She is the recipient of the 2019 Prince Claus award for "pioneering a mode of intellectual feminist filmmaking, courageously and convincingly challenging hegemonic practices and established conventions, both in filmmaking and in society". In 2020, she was a recipient of the Silpathorn Award.

She is the director of two feature films, Mundane History (2009) and By The Time It Gets Dark (2016), the latter of which won the Thailand National Film Association Award for Best Picture and Best Director, making her the first woman to be awarded, and was selected as the Thai entry for Best Foreign Language Film at the 90th Academy Awards. She has directed over a dozen shorts and video installations and is the co-director of Krabi, 2562 (2019) with British artist Ben Rivers. In 2017, she co-founded Purin Pictures, a film fund that supports independent cinema in Southeast Asia, offering much needed assistance in a region that lacks adequate governmental support. In 2007, she founded the independent film production company, Electric Eel Films, which has been recognized for its contribution toward supporting works by emerging talents from Thailand and abroad.

Early life
Anocha Suwichakornpong was born in Thailand 1976 to second generation Chinese immigrants. She spent her early childhood in Pattaya before moving to England at the age of fourteen. After completing undergraduate studies in London, she received an M.A. from University of Warwick in Arts Education and Cultural Studies. In 2006, she graduated she graduated from the MFA film program at Columbia University, where she was a recipient of Hollywood Foreign Press Association Fellowship.

Career
Anocha's thesis film from Columbia University, Graceland (2006), premiered at 59th Cannes Film Festival. It the first Thai short to be selected at Cannes Film Festival.  It was also featured at the 2007 Sundance Film Festival and many other festivals. During the production of Graceland, Anocha began working with her longterm collaborators, cinematographer Leung Ming Kai and editor Lee Chatametikool. The same year, she was selected to participate in the Talent Campus at Berlin Film Festival, where her feature-length script was among the 15 projects chosen to take part in the Script Clinic.

She co-founded her production company, Electric Eel Films, in Bangkok in 2006.

Mundane History (2006) 
Anocha's debut feature, Mundane History (Jao nok krajok, เจ้านกกระจอก), is a family drama about the friendship that develops between a young paralyzed man from a wealthy Bangkok family and his male nurse from Isan in the north of Thailand. The film is also a commentary on Thailand's class-based society and the frailty of life. It was screened at several festivals, and won the Tiger Award at the 2010 International Film Festival Rotterdam.

By The Time It Gets Dark (2016) 
In 2010, Anocha was planning her second feature, By the Time It Gets Dark, the script of which won her the Prince Claus Fund Film Grant of €15,000 from the CineMart of the Rotterdam International Film Festival. The film was released in 2016. It won the Thailand National Film Association Award for Best Picture and was selected as the Thai entry for the Best Foreign Language Film at the 90th Academy Awards.

Filmography
 Features
Mundane History (Jao nok krajok,  เจ้านกกระจอก) (2009) 
By the Time It Gets Dark (Dao Khanong, ดาวคะนอง) (2016)
Krabi, 2562 (2019, co-dir)
 Shorts
747 (2001, co-dir)
Days Like This (2002)
Full Moon (2003)
Not a New York Story (2004)
Ghosts (2005)
Graceland (2006)
Jai (2007)
Like. Real. Love (ดุจ จิต ใจ) (2008)
Black Mirror (2008)
Lunch (2010)
Overseas (2012, co-dir)
Thursday (2015)
Coconut (2015)
Nightfall (2016, co-dir)

References

External links

1976 births
Living people
Columbia University School of the Arts alumni
Anocha Suwichakornpong
Anocha Suwichakornpong
Anocha Suwichakornpong
Anocha Suwichakornpong
Anocha Suwichakornpong
Anocha Suwichakornpong